Leitner Ropeways is a business that manufactures and distributes products and equipment for ropeways, snow groomers, urban transportation systems, and wind energy in Italy and internationally. The company was founded in 1888 and was recognized in 2003 to be owned by the Leitner Group, later the HTI Group. The company also provides spare parts, repairs and testing.

Products

Leitner Ropeways manufactures various types of ropeways, such as fixed-grip and detachable chairlifts; monocable, bicable, and tricable gondola lifts; telemix; surface lifts; aerial tramways; funiculars; and inclined elevators.

History
In 1888, Gabriel Leitner established the business, specializing in farm machinery, ropeways for material transportation, waterwheels and sawmills. In 1925, the company grew from a workshop employing 10 employees to a factory to produce agricultural machinery. In 1947, the company build its first chairlift in Corvara, Italy. In 1970, agricultural machinery production ceased and was replaced by snow groomer engineering. In 1980 a production plant was built. In 1983, the company developed a detachable grip for chairlifts and gondola lifts. In 1985, the first detachable gondola lifts were made in Brunico and Valtournenche, Italy. The first 4-seater chair was made in Obereggen, Italy. In 1999, the company acquired the ropeway division of Waagner Biro.

In 2003, a company-wide reorganization resulted in the Leitner Group being formed. In the same year, the Leitwind wind turbine was released. In 2008 the MiniMetro was first built in Perugia, Italy. In 2009, Leitner produced the company's first tricable gondola lift.

Agudio
Originally founded in 1861, Agudio was later acquired by Leitner Ropeways. In 2015, Agudio was integrated into Leitner Ropeways, however, the brand was retained.

Sites 
The company has five sites. The Sterzing site located in Sterzing/Vipiteno, Italy, serves as the headquarters of Leitner AG / SpA. The Sterzing-Unterackern site is also located in Sterzing/Vipiteno, Italy. Leitner GmbH is located at the site in Telfs, Austria. Leitner France SAS is located at the site in Montmélian, France. Leitech s.r.o. is located at the Stará Ľubovňa site in Poprad, Slovakia.

References 

Companies of Italy
Aerial lift manufacturers
Manufacturing companies established in 1888
Italian brands
Manufacturing companies based in South Tyrol
1888 establishments in Austria-Hungary
Wind turbine manufacturers
Renewable energy technology companies
Wind power in Italy